Alvan (also Romanized as Alvān and ‘Alvān) is a city and capital of Shavur District, in Shush County, Khuzestan Province, Iran.  At the 2006 census, its population was 6,100, in 1,081 families.

References

Populated places in Shush County

Cities in Khuzestan Province